The Western Conference is one of Major League Soccer's two conferences, along with the Eastern Conference.

As of 2023, the Western Conference contains fourteen teams. The conference has produced eleven Supporters' Shield champions and seventeen MLS Cup winners in Major League Soccer's first 27 seasons. In 2000 and 2001, the conference was referred to as the Western Division when Major League Soccer briefly reorganized into three divisions.

2023 standings

Members

Current

Timeline

Conference lineups by year

1996 (5 teams)

Changes from 1995: Creation of the Major League Soccer.

1997 (5 teams)

Changes from 1996: Kansas City changed their name from Wiz to Wizards.

1998–99 (6 teams)Changes from 1997: The Chicago Fire was added in the 1998 expansion.

2000–01 (as Western Division) (4 teams)Changes from 1999: The Western Conference renamed itself the Western Division upon the creation of the Central Division; Chicago Fire and Dallas Burn moved into the new division; The San Jose Clash renamed to the Earthquakes.

2002–04 (5 teams)Changes from 2001: The Western Division renamed back to Western Conference following the contraction of the Miami Fusion and the Tampa Bay Mutiny, resulting in the disbanding of the Central Division; Dallas Burn moved in from the Central Division.

2005 (6 teams)Changes from 2004: Chivas USA and Real Salt Lake were added in the 2005 expansion; Kansas City Wizards moved to the Eastern Conference; The Dallas Burn renamed to FC Dallas.

2006–07 (6 teams)Changes from 2005: The San Jose Earthquakes was put on hiatus; The Houston Dynamo joined the league as an expansion franchise.

2008 (7 teams)Changes from 2007: The San Jose Earthquakes return to MLS after its hiatus.

2009–10 (8 teams)Changes from 2008: Seattle Sounders FC were added in the 2009 expansion.

2011–14 (9 teams)Changes from 2010: The Portland Timbers and Vancouver Whitecaps FC were added in the 2011 expansion; Houston Dynamo moved to the Eastern Conference.

2015–16 (10 teams)Changes from 2014: Chivas USA ceases operations; Sporting Kansas City and the Houston Dynamo move in from the Eastern Conference.

2017 (11 teams)Changes from 2016: Minnesota United FC was added in the 2017 expansion.

2018–19 (12 teams)Changes from 2017: Los Angeles FC was added in the 2018 expansion.

2020 (12 teams)Changes from 2019: Nashville SC was added in the 2020 expansion, but moved to the Eastern Conference since the MLS is Back Tournament up to the end of the 2020 season.

2021 (13 teams)Changes from 2020: Nashville SC moved to the Eastern Conference; Austin FC was added in the 2021 expansion; Houston Dynamo added "FC" to their name.

2022 (14 teams)Change from 2021: Nashville SC moved in from the Eastern Conference.

2023 (14 teams)Changes from 2022'': Nashville SC moved back to the Eastern Conference as expansion side St. Louis City SC was added to the Western Conference.

Western Conference playoff champions by year
Note: The Conference Finals were a best-of-three series through 2001 (including the MLS semifinals in 2000 and 2001, when a conference playoff format was not used). Matches tied after regulation were decided by a shoot-out. In 2002, a similar format was used except that draws were allowed and the team earning the most points advanced. From 2003 through 2011, the Finals were a single match. Matches tied after regulation went to extra time (Golden goal extra time was implemented for 2003 only), then a shoot-out if necessary. Beginning in 2012, the finals were a two-match aggregate series. The away goals rule for series that finished even on aggregate was first implemented in 2014. Extra time and shoot-outs were used if necessary, although away goals did not apply in extra time. In 2019, the playoffs returned to a single match, single elimination format (including the Conference Finals), which were hosted by the higher placed team in the regular season.

From 2015 to 2021, the Western Conference was represented in the MLS Cup by either Seattle Sounders FC or the Portland Timbers.

E – Eastern Conference team.

Western Conference Champion counts by team
As of the 2020 season, a total of 13 different teams have competed in the Western Conference Finals, and 11 of those teams have won at least once. In the table below, teams are ordered first by the number of appearances in a Western Conference Finals, then by the number of wins, and finally by year. Note that this table does not include years that a Western Conference team appeared in the Eastern Conference in the playoffs (such as 2010), and it does include appearances by Eastern Conference teams. Chivas USA (defunct), Nashville SC and the Vancouver Whitecaps FC have never made it to the Western Conference Finals.

Western Conference regular season champions by year

^ – MLS did not have draws until the 2000 season.
† – The LA Galaxy were declared winners of the Western Division in 2001 after the September 11, 2001 terrorist attacks forced the cancellation of the rest of the regular season. The MLS Cup Playoffs began on September 20.

See also
Eastern Conference (MLS)
Central Division (MLS)

References

External links 
Complete MLS History

Major League Soccer
Sports in the Western United States
Divisions of sports leagues